Jan Jelinek is a German electronic musician who also operates under the names Farben, Gramm and The Exposures. His music is usually categorized as minimal techno, glitch or microhouse, and is characterized by deep basslines, extensive use of samples from earlier jazz and rock recordings, and clicks & cuts effects. He is the founder of the German record label Faitiche.

Discography

Albums
Personal Rock as Gramm (1999)
Loop-Finding-Jazz-Records (2001)
Improvisations and Edits Tokyo, 26 September 2001 (2002)
Textstar as Farben (2002)
1+3+1 (2003)
La Nouvelle Pauvreté as The Exposures (2003)
Kosmischer Pitch (2005)
Lost Recordings 2000–2004 as The Exposures (2005)
Tierbeobachtungen (2006)
Bird, Lake, Objects with Masayoshi Fujita (2010)
Schaum with Masayoshi Fujita (2016)
Zwischen (2018)
Puls-Plus-Puls with Sven-Åke Johansson (2019)
Signals Bulletin with Asuna (2019)
The Raw and the Cooked (2021)

EPs
Tendency (2000)
Music for Fragments (2012)
PrimeTime (2012)
Do You Know Otahiti? (2013)
Temple (2013)
Relief, Pt. 1 (2019)
Ice Compositions (2021)

Singles

 "Tendency" (2000)
 "If's, And's and But's" (2002)

Compilations

 HUB Tierbeobachtungen'' (2006)

References

External links

Jan Jelinek on Discogs
Faitiche

Intelligent dance musicians
Living people
Year of birth missing (living people)
German male musicians